This is the discography of New Zealand rock band The Feelers.

Studio albums

Compilation albums

EPs

Singles

References 

Discographies of New Zealand artists
Rock music discographies